This is a list of worldwide authors' conferences for writers of all genres.

Europe

Bulgaria

 Sozopol Fiction Seminars – Sozopol

France

 Paris Writers Retreat – Paris

Iceland

 Iceland Writers Retreat – Reykjavík

Ireland

 BooksGoSocial Dublin Writers Conference – Fiction & Non Fiction – Dublin

Portugal

 Disquiet International Literary Program – Lisbon

United Kingdom

 Festival of Writing – York
 Historical Novel Society Conference – September, London
 Milford Writer's Workshop – science fiction writers; various locations
 Winchester Writers' Conference – Winchester
 Swanwick Writers' Summer School – the UK's longest-running writers' school
 Writers Holiday

North America

Bahamas

 Salt Cay Writers Retreat  – Salt Cay, Bahamas

Canada

 Shuswap International Writers' Festival – Salmon Arm, British Columbia
 Surrey International Writers' Conference – Surrey, British Columbia
  Ontario Writers' Conference – Durham Region, Ontario

Mexico
 San Miguel Writers' Conference & Literary Festival – San Miguel de Allende, Guanajuato

United States

A–E

 The Alabama Writers' Conclave – Alabama
 Alabama Writing Workshop – Birmingham, Alabama
 Algonkian Writer Conferences – Arizona, California, Massachusetts, Virginia
 The Aloha Writers Conference – Kapalua, Maui, Hawaii
 American Christian Fiction Writers Conference – location varies
 American Society of Journalists and Authors (ASJA) annual conference – New York City, New York
 Antioch Writers' Workshop – Yellow Springs, Ohio
 Arkansas Writers Conference – Little Rock, Arkansas
 Art of the Wild Writers' Conference – Olympic Valley, California
 Association of Personal Historians conference – location varies, Canada and United States
 Atlanta Writers Conference – Atlanta, Georgia
 Atlanta Writing Workshop – Atlanta, Georgia
 Atlantic Center for the Arts Master Artists-in-Residence Program – New Smyrna Beach, Florida
 The Auburn Writers Conference – Auburn, Alabama
 Author U Extravaganza conference – Denver, Colorado
 Authors Combat Academy – Nashville, Tennessee
 Authors Conference Infinity Publishing Gathering of Authors – Valley Forge, Pennsylvania
 Authors of the Flathead conference – Kalispell, Montana*
 Authors' Salon at Clockwork Alchemy - Burlingame, California*
 Avondale Writers Conference – Avondale, Arizona
 AWP Conference & Bookfair – North America's largest literary conference; location varies
 Backspace Writers Conference
 Bear River Writers' Conference – Boyne City, Michigan
 Blaze Your Own Trail to Self-Publishing Writers' Conference – San Diego, California
 BlogU – Baltimore, Maryland
 Blue Flower Arts Winter Writers Conference – New Smyrna Beach, Florida
 Book Passage Children's Writers & Illustrators Conference – Corte Madera, California
 Book Passage Mystery Writers Conference – Corte Madera, California
 Book Passage Travel Writers & Photographers Conference – Corte Madera, California
 BookBaby Independent Authors Conference – Philadelphia, PA
 Boston Writing Workshop – Boston, Massachusetts
 Bread Loaf Writers' Conference – Middlebury, Vermont
 Business of Pet Writing Conference – New York City, New York
 Business of Writing International Summit – August 1–2, 2014; Louisville, Kentucky
 California Dreamin' Writers' Conference – Brea, California
 Calliope Writing Coach – year round; Salt Lake City, Utah
 Cape Cod Writers Center Conference – Cape Cod, Massachusetts
 Carolinas Writers Conference – Wadesboro, North Carolina
 Castle Rock Writers' Conference – Castle Rock, Colorado
 Chanticleer Authors Conference – Bellingham, Washington
 Chapter One Young Writers Conference – Chicago, Illinois
 Chesapeake Writing Workshop – Washington, D.C.
 Chicago Writing Workshop – Chicago, Illinois
 Chuckanut Writers Conference – Bellingham, Washington
 Cleveland Writing Workshop – Cleveland, Ohio
 Colorado Christian Writers Conference – Estes Park, Colorado
 Colorado Gold – Denver, Colorado
 Colrain Poetry Manuscript Conference – Colrain, Massachusetts
 The Creative Nonfiction Writers Conference – Pittsburgh, Pennsylvania
 Crested Butte Writers Conference – Crested Butte, Colorado
 Crossroads Writers' Conference – Macon, Georgia
 DFW Writers Conference (DFWCon) – Dallas-Fort Worth, Texas
 Erma Bombeck Writers' Workshop – Dayton, Ohio

F–M

 Florida Writing Workshop – Tampa, Florida
 Florida Christian Writers Conference Leesburg, Florida
 The Frost Place Conference on Poetry – Franconia, New Hampshire
 The Frost Place Conference on Poetry and Teaching – Franconia, New Hampshire
 The Frost Place Poetry Seminar – Franconia, New Hampshire
 The Frost Place Writing Intensive – Franconia, New Hampshire
 Georgia Writers SpringFest Conference – Kennesaw, Georgia
 Golden Crown Literary Society Annual Conference - July/August; various locations
 Hampton Roads Writers' Conference – Virginia Beach, Virginia
 Hawaii Writers Conference (formerly the Maui Writers Conference) – Maui, Hawaii
 HippoCamp: A Conference for Creative Nonfiction Writers, presented by Hippocampus Magazine – August 2015, Lancaster, Pennsylvania
 Historical Novel Society Conference in North America – mid-to-late June; various locations
 Historical Writers of America Conference – August 19–21, 2016, Colonial Williamsburg, Virginia
 Hollihock Writers Conference – New Bedford, Massachusetts
 Horseback Writing Retreats – Wyoming
 Houston Writers Guild – Annual Writers Conference – April; various locations
 How to Write & Publish Your Book – Mississippi
 Indiana Faith and Writing Conference – Anderson, Indiana
 Indiana University Writers' Conference – Bloomington, Indiana
 Indiana Writing Workshop – Indianapolis, Indiana
 Jack London Writers Conference – San Francisco, California
 Jackson Hole Writers Conference – Jackson Hole, Wyoming
 Judith Briles Unplugged Authors and Writers Conference – August 27–29, 2015; Denver, Colorado
 Juniper Institute for Young Writers – Amherst, Massachusetts
 Juniper Summer Writing Institute – Amherst, Massachusetts
 Kachemak Bay Writers Conferenece – Homer, Alaska
 Kauai Writers Conference – November 9–11, 2018; Kapaa, Kauai, Hawaii
 Kentucky Women Writers Conference – Lexington, Kentucky
 Key West Literary Seminar – Key West, Florida
 Killer Nashville – last full weekend every August; Nashville, Tennessee
 LA Writers Conference – Los Angeles, California
  Liberty States Fiction Writers Create Something Magical Conference – Iselin, New Jersey
 Life the Universe & Everything (LTUE) – Provo, Utah
 Literary Cleveland Inkubator Conference - Cleveland, Ohio
 Longleaf Writers Conference at Seaside, FL Seaside, Florida
 Los Angeles Writers Retreat – Los Angeles, California
 Mad Anthony Writers' Conference – Hamilton, Ohio
 Meet the Publishers! - Tulsa, Oklahoma
 Mendocino Coast Writers Conference – Fort Bragg, California
 Michigan Writing Workshop – Livonia, Michigan
 Minnesota Writing Workshop – Minneapolis, Minnesota
 Mississippi Writers Guild Writers' Conference – Vicksburg, Mississippi

N–Z

 Nashville Writers Conference – Nashville, Tennessee
 NETWO's Annual Spring Writers Roundup – Mt. Pleasant, Texas
 New Orleans Genre Writer's Conference – New Orleans, Louisiana
 North Georgia Christian Writers Conference – Toccoa, Georgia
 Northern Colorado Writers Conference – Fort Collins, Colorado
 Northwest Georgia Writers Conference Calhoun, Georgia
 New York Pitch Conference – New York City, New York
 Oklahoma Writers' Federation, Inc. (OWFI) – Oklahoma City, Oklahoma
 Ozark Creative Writers Conference – Eureka Springs, Arkansas
 Philadelphia Writing Workshop – Philadelphia, Pennsylvania
 Pikes Peak Writers Conference – Colorado Springs, Colorado
 Pittsburgh Writing Workshop – Pittsburgh, Pennsylvania
 PublishingGame.com Conference – Boston, Massachusetts
 Quills Conference – Salt Lake City, Utah
 Read.Write.Share. Writers Weekend – Little Rock, Arkansas
 Red Clay Writers Conference – Kennesaw, Georgia
 River Writing Journeys for Women – Moab, Utah
 Rosemary Beach Spring Writers' Conference – May 11–14, 2011; Rosemary Beach, Florida
 St. Davids Christian Writers' Conference – Grove City, Pennsylvania
 San Francisco Writers Conference – February 14–17; San Francisco, California
 San Francisco Writing Workshop – San Francisco, California
Sanibel Island Writers Conference – Sanibel Island, Florida
 Santa Barbara Writers Conference – Santa Barbara, California
 Santa Fe Writers Conference – Santa Fe, New Mexico
 Scribbler's Retreat Writer's Conference – St. Simons Island, Georgia
 Seattle Writing Workshop – Seattle, Washington
 Sewanee Writers' Conference – Sewanee, Tennessee
 SF:SE 2015 – Orlando, Florida
 Society of Children's Book Writers and Illustrators – two per year: summer – Los Angeles, California; winter – New York City, New York
 Southampton Writers Conference – Southampton, New York
 Southern California Writers' Conference
 Southern Christian Writers Conference – Tuscaloosa, Alabama
 Southern Women Writer's Conference – Berry College, Rome, Georgia
 Southwest Christian Writers Conference – Durango, Colorado
 Space Coast Writers' Guild Annual Conference – Melbourne, Florida
 Squaw Valley Writer's Conference – Olympic Valley, California
 Taos Summer Writers' Conference – Taos, New Mexico
 Tennessee Writing Workshop – Nashville, Tennessee
 Truckee Meadows Community College (TMCC) Writers' Conference – Reno, Nevada
 Tulsa NightWriters Craft of Writing Conference – Tulsa, Oklahoma
 UNF Writers Conference – August 5–7, 2011; University of North Florida, Jacksonville, Florida
 Unicorn Writer's Conference – Manhattanville College, Purchase, New York
 Wesleyan Writers Conference – Middletown, Connecticut
 West Coast Writers Conference – July 20–22, 2012; Los Angeles Valley College, Los Angeles, California
 White County Creative Writers Conference - Searcy, Arkansas
 Willamette Writers conference – Willamette Writers' annual conference; on the first weekend in August; Portland, Oregon
 Women Writing the West – Los Angeles, California
 WordSmitten Writing Conference – St. Petersburg, Florida
 Write-by-the-Lake Annual Writer's Retreat – Madison, Wisconsin
 Write in Atlanta 2011 – Atlanta, Georgia
 Write Stuff – Greater Lehigh Valley Writers Group, Bethlehem, Pennsylvania
 Write to Publish Conference – Wheaton, Illinois
 Writer's Digest Conference – August 1–3, 2014; The Roosevelt Hotel, New York City, New York
 The Writer's Hotel NYC Writers Conference – New York City, New York
 The Writers' Institute – Madison, Wisconsin
 Writers' Police Academy – Green Bay, Wisconsin
 Writers @ Work – Park City, Utah
 Writers in Florence
 Writers in New York
 Writers in Paradise – St. Petersburg, Florida
 Writers in Paris
 The Writing Academy – Farmington, Minnesota
 Writing and Illustrating for Young Readers Conference – Salt Lake City, Utah
 Writing By Writers Workshop @ Tomales Bay
 Writing It Real in Port Townsend – Port Townsend, Washington
 Yale Writers' Conference – New Haven, Connecticut

South America

Peru

 Peru, Weaving Words & Women

See also

African Writers Conference

Notes

Lists of conferences
Literature lists